Mitch Baker may refer to:
Mitch Baker (Grand Theft Auto), fictional character from the video game Grand Theft Auto
Mitch Baker (EastEnders), fictional character in EastEnders

See also
Mitchell Baker (born 1959), chairperson of the Mozilla Foundation